Anjos is a station on the Green Line of the Lisbon Metro. The station is located on the Almirante Reis Avenue, close to Monte Agudo. It takes its name from the historic Anjos parish.

History
The station was designed by the architect Denis Gomes with art installations by the painter Maria Keil.

Connections

Urban buses

Carris 
 208 Cais do Sodré ⇄ Estação Oriente (Interface) (morning service)
 708 Martim Moniz ⇄ Parque das Nações Norte
 712 Estação Santa Apolónia ⇄ Alcântara Mar (Museu do Oriente)
 726 Sapadores ⇄ Pontinha Centro
 730 Picheleira (Quinta do Lavrado) ⇄ Picoas

Aerobus 
 Linha 1 Aeroporto ⇄ Cais do Sodré

See also
 List of Lisbon metro stations

References

External links

Green Line (Lisbon Metro) stations
Railway stations opened in 1966